Crispus Attucks (c. 1723–1770) is the mixed-race former slave killed in the Boston Massacre.

Crispus Attucks also may refer to:
 Crispus Attucks High School in Indianapolis
 Crispus Attucks Elementary School in Kansas City, Missouri

See also

 Attucks High School (Hopkinsville, Kentucky)
 Attucks School (Vinita, Oklahoma)
 Attucks Theatre (Norfolk, Virginia)